is a rechargeable contactless smart card ticketing system for public transport in Kagoshima, Japan, introduced by Kagoshima City Transportation Bureau, Nangoku Kōtsū, and JR Kyūshū Bus, from April 1, 2005. The name is the acronym of Rapid and Pay Intelligent Card. Just like JR East's Suica or JR West's ICOCA, the card uses RFID technology developed by Sony corporation known as FeliCa. The card is usable in all the tramway lines of Kagoshima City Transportation Bureau, as well as most bus lines of the three operators.

Another bus operator in Kagoshima, namely Iwasaki Corporation group issues another smart card called Iwasaki IC Card. RapiCa and Iwasaki IC Card have integrated services, meaning either card can be used for most bus lines in the city. A future smart card to be introduced by JR Kyūshū will have an integrated service too. Since the said card will have integrated services with Suica, PASMO, ICOCA, PiTaPa, TOICA and others, those cards will have the services with RapiCa as well.

External links 
  Official website by Kagoshima City Transportation Bureau
  Official website by Nangoku Kōtsū

Fare collection systems in Japan
Contactless smart cards